Lilies of the Streets is a 1925 American silent drama film directed by Joseph Levering and starring Virginia Lee Corbin, Wheeler Oakman, and Johnnie Walker.

Plot
As described in a film magazine review, Judith Lee is a young woman of indulgent parents and is allowed to have her own way. After she is dishonored by a blackmailer, and her mother is on the verge of compromise, the blackmailer is murdered by one of his victims. Judith Lee, believing her mother is guilty, assumes the blame and is about to be convicted when her fiancé, a lawyer, obtains the confession of the real assassin.

Cast

References

Bibliography
 Munden, Kenneth White. The American Film Institute Catalog of Motion Pictures Produced in the United States, Part 1. University of California Press, 1997.

External links

Stills at silenthollywood.com

1925 films
1925 drama films
1920s English-language films
American silent feature films
Silent American drama films
Film Booking Offices of America films
American black-and-white films
Films directed by Joseph Levering
1920s American films